The Diss Express is an English newspaper that covers a 500-square-mile circulation area on the Norfolk/Suffolk border and has a print/online audience of more than 29,000. It was owned by Johnston Press with a print edition released every Friday. Major towns and villages covered by the Diss Express include Diss, Eye, Harleston, Debenham and Long Stratton. In January 2017, it was bought along with 12 other titles, by Iliffe Media for £17m. Since then, it has been printed in Cambridge.

The paper was founded by Mr Abbott in November 1864 as the Diss Express and Norfolk & Suffolk Journal.

Since June 2020, the Chief Reporter at the newspaper has been Joe Hadden.

References

External links 

Newspapers published in Norfolk
Newspapers published in Suffolk
Publications established in 1864
Newspapers published by Johnston Press